Ozimops loriae  is a species of bat found in Australia and Papua New Guinea.

The common names include Loria's mastiff bat and little northern free-tailed bat. The species was formerly described as Mormopterus loriae, and assigned to an Australian centred taxon Ozimops in 2014.

References

Ozimops
Mammals described in 1897
Taxa named by Oldfield Thomas
Bats of Oceania